Khutabat: Fundamentals of Islam is a book written by Sayyid Abul Ala Maududi. It was originally published in 1988, then later re-translated and published under the title Let Us Be Muslims.

External links
 Full text on witness-pioneer.org
 Khutabat: Fundamentals of Islam. Kazi Publications, 1988. 
 Let Us Be Muslims. Kazi Publications, 2003. 

1988 non-fiction books
Books by Sayyid Abul Ala Maududi